Li Guohao may refer to:

Li Guohao (engineer) (1913-2005), Chinese engineer
Brandon Lee (1965 – 1993), Chinese name Li Guohao, Chinese-American actor, son of Bruce Lee